Defence company may mean:

 Private defense company, an enterprise which would provide personal protection and military defense services to individuals who would voluntarily contract for its services
 Private military company, provides armed security services, i.e. "Contractors"
 Defense Companies (Syria), a former paramilitary force
 Arms industry, a business  that manufactures weapons and military technology and equipment.